The Uncanny House (German: Das unheimliche Haus) is a 1916 German silent mystery film directed by Richard Oswald and starring Werner Krauss, Reinhold Schünzel and Lupu Pick. It was released in three parts. The second part was called Der chinesische Götze and the third Freitag, der 13.

The film's sets were designed by the art director Manfred Noa.

Cast

Part I
 Werner Krauss as Albert von Sievers
 Alfred Breiderhoff as Diener 
 Lupu Pick as Arthur Wüllner
 Kathe Oswald as Kammerzofe 
 Rita Clermont as Frau im Spiegel 
 Heinz Sarnow as Fritz Bodmer
 Max Bing as Martin Whist
 Arnold Czempin
 Max Gülstorff as Fox' Freund Fix 
 Nelly Lagarst as Frau Eibner 
 Ernst Ludwig as Herbert von Eulenstein 
 Hans Marton as Sohn Marcel Eulenstein 
 Emil Rameau as Herr Eibner 
 Franz Ramharter as Leonie Cardailhan (Schwester)
 Reinhold Schünzel as Engelbert Fox 
 Kissa von Sievers as Mary Seeber

References

Bibliography
 Bock, Hans-Michael & Bergfelder, Tim. The Concise CineGraph. Encyclopedia of German Cinema. Berghahn Books, 2009.

External links

1916 films
Films of the German Empire
German silent feature films
Films directed by Richard Oswald
German mystery films
1916 mystery films
German black-and-white films
Silent mystery films
1910s German films